Louisville Township may refer to:

Louisville Township, Clay County, Illinois
Louisville Township, Pottawatomie County, Kansas, in Pottawatomie County, Kansas
Louisville Township, Red Lake County, Minnesota
Louisville Township, Scott County, Minnesota

Township name disambiguation pages